St. Joseph Catholic High School is a secondary school located in North-Central Edmonton. In a guided customized learning program, students develop the essential skills required to build effective working relationships with their peers and faculty. The faculties objective is to help all students gain the essential skills required to be a self-directed learner upon graduating from this high school. St. Joseph is a member of the Canadian Coalition of Self-Directed Learners and is the only self-directed learning school in Canada to offer International Baccalaureate. The Jean Forest All Girls Leadership Academy' is also located within the high school.

History
St. Joseph High School first opened in 1930 as the first high school for the Catholic boys in the Edmonton region. In the 1950s with the closing of St. Mary's High School, St. Joseph opened its doors to girls. Since 1998, St. Joseph's High School has offered self-directed learning programs.

Programs of Study
 Guided Customized Learning (GCL) 
 Traditional Classroom-Based Learning
 International Baccalaureate
 Knowledge and Employability
 WIN Program (formerly Educational Experiences)
 English Language Learning
 Dual Credit Program
 Nehiyaw Pimatisiwin Cree Language and Culture Program & Braided Journey FMNI
 Diploma Self Regulated Learning (DSRL)
 ECSD Online Schooling 10-12 (New programming during COVID-19 Pandemic)
 Newcomers programming
 4th and 5th year programming
Within these programs exists the Jean Forest Leadership Academy (JFLA) and Career Skills Centre. The Jean forest Leadership Academy is an all girls program that allows girls to work alongside other girls within the confines of their school. The Career Skills Centre, housed at St. Joseph High School, is Edmonton Catholic School District's new centralized technical and trade career education site. The Skills Centre allows students from around the district to take part in CTS programs not necessarily available at their home school.

The Guided Customized Learning Program, Nehiyaw Pimatisiwin Cree Language and Culture program, and the Jean Forest Leadership Academy is open to all student residing within the city limit.

As of 2020 Italian Language and JFLA is no longer offered at St. Joseph.

Knowledge and Employability 
The Knowledge and Employability (K&E) program is offered at St. Joseph for students who learn best through experiences that integrate essential and employability skills in occupational contexts.  Traditionally, students enrolled in the K&E program in Alberta will earn only their Certificate of Achievement and not a Diploma. At St. Joseph, The K&E program is referred to as the Dash 4 Pathway as students are presented with an opportunity to still achieve their Alberta High School Diploma as well as their Certificate of Achievement. Through the Guided Customized Learning program, students in Dash-4 can choose to take on six additional classes to bridge from dash-4 courses to dash-2, thus satisfying Alberta Diploma requirements.

WIN Program 
The WIN Program is a program of choice for high school student that have a mild to severe learning need. Student enrolled in this program obtain a Certificate of Completion and have the option to partake in Dash-4 Pathway depending on student academic success. This program also have scheduled lecture within the WIN Program as well. The main goal for the WIN Program is developing students strength, communication, social and learning skills, as well as living, vocational, leisure and recreational skills to become successful in the real-world.

The WIN Program are facilitated by staff employed and/or contracted by the Edmonton Catholic School District and/or Alberta Health Services staff include but are not limited to:

Occupational Therapist
Speech Therapist
Emotional Behavior Specialist 
Family School Liaison Worker
Mental Health Therapist
Adapted Physical Education Specialist
Physical Therapist
Vision and Hearing Consultant

Each student in the WIN Program receive an Individualized Program Plan (IPP) for teachers and parents to monitor they're child academic success and focus on area and aspect that need improvement. Most WIN students don't receive a report card.

Work Study 
Student in the WIN Program will also have the option to partake in Work Study Placement each placement are individualized to each student depending on student interest. The WIN Program also have an on-site Work Study Coordinator helping student and staff look and determine placement for each students. There is no boundary for the Work Study Placement as long if it within the City Of Edmonton limit.

Athletics
The Saints compete in the Metro Edmonton High School Athletic Association in various sports such as basketball, football, soccer, volleyball, track and field, badminton, cross country, curling, golf, and swimming. In the 1981/82 school year, St.Joes became the first and only catholic high school in Edmonton to ever win a triple crown in which they won a Senior City Championship in Football, Basketball, and Soccer all in a single school year.

Father Michael Troy Tournament

Every year since 1984, St. Joseph has hosted the Father Michael Troy Basketball tournament. Teams from around Canada have participated in the tournament since its inception. Recently, teams from Marburg, Germany have competed. The namesake of the tournament, the late Father Michael Troy, considered the association of his name with this tournament one of the greatest honors in his lifetime.

Notable alumni
Don Barry (Canadian football) - Former Center & 3-time Grey Cup Winner for the Edmonton Eskimos
Eddie Carroll - Voice Actor known as the voice of Jiminey Cricket for 37 years
Peter Cunningham - Retired 7-time World Champion Kickboxer
Jim Donlevy - Former University of Alberta Golden Bears football Coach (1971–80, 1984–90) and Western Hockey League educational consultant. Led the Golden Bears to Vanier Cup victories in 1972 and 1980.
Hank Ilesic - Former Punter for Edmonton Eskimos and 7-time Grey Cup Winner. Inducted into the Canadian Football Hall of Fame in 2018
Gene Kiniski - Former football player for the Edmonton Eskimos and professional wrestler
Honourable Marcel Lambert - Former Canadian Politician and Speaker of the House of Commons of Canada (1962–63)
Honourable Thomas Lukaszuk - Member of the Legislative Assembly of Alberta
Gene Principe - Current Sports Reporter for Sportsnet
Bill Smith (Alberta politician) - Mayor of Edmonton 1995-2004 and former defensive back for the Edmonton Eskimos 1956-63
Honourable Allan Wachowich - Former Chief Justice of the Court of Queen's Bench of Alberta 2001-2009

Incidents
St. Joseph High School was flooded in early August 2016 causing $1 million damage due to a sewage backup. The water was 1.5 metres deep causing damage to the rehearsal room and the music room. Collection of musical instrument, drama costume, prop and set has to be replaced and cleaned. Floor and walling of the basement has to be replaced as well. Drama and Music class is temporarily set up elsewhere in the school while crew repair section of the basement. Student and staff have noticed foul smell in the sub-basement as the sub-basement is located next to a sewer. The basement leading to the WIN Program is unaffected by the flood.

See also
Edmonton Catholic School District
Schools in Alberta

References

High schools in Edmonton
Catholic secondary schools in Alberta
Educational institutions established in 1931
1931 establishments in Alberta